Seth Savoy (born April 23, 1992) is a Cajun film director and screenwriter.

Early life
Born in Denver Colorado and grew up in Little Rock, Arkansas. He attended Catholic High School for Boys, followed by The University of Central Arkansas and Columbia College Chicago.

Career
Savoy's collaborative film Blood Brothers was picked up by Indieflix and Hulu. His videos have been featured on VH1, MTV Gospel, California Music Network TV, and MTV 2.
Savoy has worked with sound designers of Goodfellas, Home Alone, and Hoop Dreams, colorists of The Dark Knight and Canadian Academy Award-winning composers. He has also worked with a number of high charting award-winning and Grammy Nominee artists such as Twista, Mike Jones, and Asher Roth.

Savoy's short films began to get recognition screening at 66 film festivals around the world. In 2015 he won a award at the Sundance Film Festival for his screenplay Echo Boomers which is set to release 2020. The film stars Michael Shannon, Patrick Schwarzenegger, Alex Pettyfer, Leslie Ann Warren, Hayley Law, Gilles Geary and Oliver Cooper.

Filmography

Film reviews
 Beyond the Bridge Review
 Smith's Verdict
 Jess Carson Review
 Exclusive Will Poulter Short

References

External links
 

1992 births
Living people
American film directors
Columbia College Chicago alumni